Sylvia on a Spree is a lost 1918 American silent comedy film directed by Harry L. Franklin and starring Emmy Wehlen, W. I. Percival, and Frank Currier. It was released on December 16, 1918.

Cast

External links

References

1918 films
American silent feature films
American black-and-white films
Metro Pictures films
Films directed by Harry L. Franklin
Silent American comedy films
1918 comedy films
Lost American films
1918 lost films
Lost comedy films
1910s English-language films
1910s American films